B'z TV Style II Songless version is the second compilation album by the Japanese rock duo B'z. It is another karaoke compilation with instrumentals only. The album sold 109,280 copies in total, reaching #17 at Oricon.

Track listing 
Blowin'
Zero
Koi-Gokoro
Time

Mou Ichidou Kiss Shitakatta (もう一度キスしたかった )
Wonderful Opportunity
Gimme Your Love -fukutsu no Love Driver- (Gimme Your Love -不屈のLove Driver- )
Hadashi no megami (裸足の女神)
Don't Leave Me
Motel
Negai (ねがい)
Love Me, I Love You
Love Phantom
Itsuka no Meriikurisumasu (いつかのメリークリスマス)

References

External links 
 

B'z compilation albums
1995 compilation albums